The Baltimore City College boys' basketball team, known as the "Knights", or formerly, the "Collegians", "Castlemen", and "Alamedans", has represented Baltimore City College, the city of Baltimore's flagship public college preparatory school, for more than 100 years. One of the earliest results recorded in program history is a one-point overtime road loss to the University of Maryland Terrapins (then known as the Maryland Agricultural College Aggies) on January 25, 1913. In 1919, B.C.C. join the Maryland Scholastic Association (MSA) as a founding member. The program won MSA A-Conference championships in 1922, 1923, 1934, 1935, 1938, 1939, 1940, 1961, 1963, 1965, 1966, 1967, and 1969.

The Black Knights joined the Maryland Public Secondary Schools Athletic Association (MPSSAA) prior to the 1992-93 season. City College has won four state championships (2009, 2010, 2014, 2023) and appeared in the state semifinals eight times (1997, 1998, 1999, 2009, 2010, 2014, 2022, 2023). Since joining the MPSSAA in 1992, B.C.C ranks fifth in state championships and ninth in state semifinals appearances among all Maryland public high schools. The Black Knights have finished the season ranked among the top-20 nationally in the USA Today Super 25 boys basketball poll twice since 2010, and the program boasts ten First Team All-Metro players since 2007. Four City College boys basketball teams have completed undefeated seasons in program history (1966, 1967, 2014, 2023).

Omarr Smith, B.C.C. '98, was named head boys basketball coach before the 2017–18 season. As head coach, led the program to appearances in the 2022 and 2023 3A state semifinals and the 2023 Baltimore City League championship. Coach Smith led the team to a 28-0 undefeated record and the 3A state championship during the 2022-23 season. As a player, Coach Smith helped lead the program to two state semifinals appearances, including the school's first appearance in the state championship game in 1998. 

† Ranking from the USA Today Super 25 National Boys Basketball Poll

‡ Ranking from The Baltimore Sun Top-15 Metro Boys Basketball Poll

History

MSA era (1919-1993)
Baltimore City College began competing in the Maryland Scholastic Association (MSA) in 1919 when it was invited to join as a founding member. The Knights captured MSA championships in 1922, 1923, 1934, 1935, 1938, 1939, 1940, 1961, 1963, 1966, 1967, and  1969. Between 1960 and 1968, head coach George Howard “Jerry” Phipps led the Knights to a record of 133-27 (.831), five MSA championships (1961, 1963, 1965, 1966, and 1967), and a 40-game consecutive win streak between 1966 and 1967. City's 1967 team posted an undefeated season, the second of back-to-back perfect seasons, and was led to the MSA championship by team captain Leonard Hamm, who later became commissioner of the Baltimore Police Department. Eugene Parker, who in 1954 became the first Black faculty member in City College history, replaced Phipps as head coach in 1969 and guided the Knights to the MSA championship. In all, City College won thirteen MSA basketball titles. After 75 years of membership, the school withdrew from the MSA to join the Maryland Public Secondary Schools Athletic Association (MPSSAA) in 1993.

MPSSAA era (1993-present)

Baltimore City College has won four MPSSAA state championships (2009, 2010, 2014, 2023). City is one of just five schools in Maryland that have won three or more boys basketball state titles since 2000.
The Knights have advanced to the MPSSAA state tournament semifinals six times (1997, 1998, 1999, 2009, 2010, and 2014), third most all-time among Baltimore City League teams.

Wayne Cook took over as head boys basketball coach in 1989 and led the Knights to the school's final Maryland Scholastic Association (MSA) victory in 1993. Following a 10-10 finish in 1994, Daryl Wade replaced Cook as head boys basketball coach in 1995. In his second season at the helm, Coach Wade led the Knights to the first Maryland Public Secondary Schools Athletic Association (MPSSAA) state tournament semifinal appearance in school history in 1997, the school's fourth year as a MPSSAA member. Coach Wade led City College boys basketball to two additional trips to the MPSSAA state semifinals in 1998 and 1999 before leaving the program to coach at nearby Mergenthaler Vocational-Technical High School in 2000.

In 2005, longtime Towson Catholic High School coach Mike Daniel was named head coach at Baltimore City College. In his first season as head coach, Daniels led Baltimore City College to a record of 15 wins and 8 losses, a major improvement over the 2004–05 season in which the Black Knights won just two games al season. In his next two seasons, Coach Daniel led City College to back-to-back 20-win seasons, including a 20–5 win–loss record in 2007 and a 20–4 mark in 2008. In his fourth season, Coach Daniel guided the team to the MPSSAA state tournament championship in 2009, the first boys basketball state title in school history. After guiding the Knights to back-to-back MPSSAA state championships, a 24–3 record, and a No. 1 ranking in the final The Baltimore Sun boys basketball poll, Mike Daniel was named All-Metro Coach of the Year in 2010. In 2011, City College ended its season with a mark of 16–9, ranked No 6. in The Baltimore Sun boys basketball poll, and with a loss to Edmondson-Westside High School in the MPSSAA regional semifinals. Coach Daniel left the program at the conclusion of the 2011 season to take over as head coach at Severn High School in suburban Anne Arundel County, Maryland.

At the start of the 2011–2012 season, Daryl Wade re-joined the program for the second time as head boys basketball coach. The 2012 team finished the season with a record of 21-6 and lost in the MPSSAA regional semifinals to Patterson High School, which went on to capture the state championship.  In 2013, the Knights compiled a 20–6 record and a No. 8 ranking in the final The Baltimore Sun boys basketball poll, but fell in the MPSSAA regional final again to the eventual state champions. With an undefeated record of 27–0, the Knights finished the 2014 season as the No. 18-ranked team in the United States in the final USA Today Super 25 and Student Sports Fab 50 national boys basketball polls. City College began the 2015 season ranked No. 10 in The Baltimore Sun boys basketball poll. The Knights' 30-game win streak, which spanned two seasons, ended in the school's Baltimore City League opener against arch-rival Baltimore Polytechnic Institute, the Engineers' first win over City College in nearly 10 years.

Omarr Smith, B.C.C. '98, was named head boys basketball coach before the 2017–18 season. As head coach, Smith has amassed an overall record of 97-20 (.829), including an appearance in the 2022 3A state semifinals and the 2023 Baltimore City League championship. During the 2022-23 season, Coach Smith led the team to a 23-0 undefeated regular season record and the top seed in the 3A basketball tournament.

Recent season-by-season results 

† Ranking from the USA Today Super 25 National Boys Basketball Poll

‡ Ranking from The Baltimore Sun Top-15 Metro Boys Basketball Poll

Knights in the NCAA 

In 2013, City College ranked third among all Baltimore-area high schools with five former players on current NCAA Division I rosters. Nick Faust, a member of two B.C.C. state championship teams, was named to the 2012 Atlantic Coast Conference All-Freshman team at Maryland. Former small forward C.J. Fair, who helped lead City College to a 25–4 record and the MPSSAA Class 2A regional semifinals as a sophomore, was named 2013 ACC Preseason Player of the Year at Syracuse. Former forward Charles Tapper played basketball and football at City College and was a First Team All-Big 12 Conference defensive end for the Oklahoma Sooners in 2013. Will Barton, a current member of the NBA's Denver Nuggets, was a shooting guard at City College before ultimately finishing his high school basketball career at Brewster Academy in New Hampshire. Barton was the Conference USA men's basketball Player of the Year in 2011 and was selected by the Portland Trail Blazers in the 2012 NBA Draft.

In recent years, several former boys basketball student-athletes have accepted scholarship offers to play basketball at NCAA Division I schools in recent years. That list includes: 
 Will Barton, SG, 2010 Memphis Tigers
 Tim Bond, G, 2014 Eastern Michigan Eagles
 Mike Cheatham, SG, 2011 Marshall Thundering Herd
 C.J. Fair, SF, 2008 Syracuse Orange
 Nick Faust, SG, 2011 Maryland Terrapins
 Todd Galloway, SG, 2003 Florida State Seminoles
 Jordan Latham, PF, 2009 Xavier Musketeers
 Dwayne Morgan, SF, 2013 UNLV Running Rebels
 Aron Nwankwo, F, 2010 Pittsburgh Panthers
 Kamau Stokes, PG, 2014 Kansas State Wildcats
 Charles Tapper, F, 2011 Oklahoma Sooners football

First-Team All-Metro players
Baltimore City College ranks second among all Baltimore-area high schools—public, private, and parochial—with eight first-team All-Metro selections since 2007. In 2014, three players were selected to the All-Metro first team, a single-season school record.

First-Team All-Metro Selections
 
 Devin Brown, Guard (2007) 
 C.J. Fair, Forward (2008)
 Adam Johnson, Forward (2009) 
 Jordan Latham, Center (2010)
 Nick Faust, Guard (2011)
 Timmy Bond, Guard (2014)
 Omari George, Guard (2014)
 Kamau Stokes, Guard (2014)
 Dominick Carrington, Guard (2020)
 Kyree Smith, Guard (2022)
 Cam Horton, Guard (2022)

Undefeated seasons

2022-23: Most wins in school history (28-0)
With its second undefeated season in nine years and fourth overall, the 2022-23 Black Knights posted a 28-0 record en route to  the 2023 Baltimore City League championship, 2023 MPSSAA 3A North Region championship, and 2023 MPSSAA 3A state championship. The team's 28 victories are the most in program history, besting its previous record of 27 wins set during the 2013-14 season. B.C.C. became the first Baltimore City League school to complete two undefeated seasons since 1992-93. Head coach Omarr Smith led the Knights to its second consecutive 3A state semifinal appearance and finished the season as the No. 2-ranked team in The Baltimore Sun final boys basketball poll behind nationally-ranked Mount Saint Joseph High School.

2013-14: First undefeated season in 47 years (27-0)
With a record of 22–0, the 2013-14 Knights won the Baltimore City Division I basketball championship and posted the school's first undefeated regular season since 1967. The Knights entered the MPSSAA 3A state basketball tournament as the top-seeded team in the East region. On March 15, 2014, the Knights defeated Westlake High School (Maryland) in the MPSSAA finals to win the 3A state championship, finishing the season 27–0. The Knights set a school record with 27 wins in a single season. In so doing, City College completed its third perfect season in school history and became the first Baltimore City League team since the 2008–2009 season to post an undefeated record. City finished the season as the No. 1-ranked team in The Baltimore Sun boys basketball poll for the second time in four years. The Knights finished ranked No. 18 nationally in the final USA Today Super 25 and Student Sports Fab 50 boys basketball polls, the second highest ranking of any team in Maryland, Pennsylvania, Virginia, and Washington, D.C.

1966-67: Back-to-back undefeated seasons and MSA Championships (20-0)
In 1967, City College completed its second of two consecutive undefeated seasons under Coach Jerry Phipps. The Knights finished the season ranked No. 1 in the final Baltimore Sun boys basketball poll and won the second of back-to-back MSA championships. Leonard Hamm, who later became commissioner of the Baltimore Police Department, was team captain.

1965-66: First undefeated season in program history (20-0)
The top-ranked Knights finished the season with a record of 20-0 and beat perennial power Dunbar High School twice during the 1965–66 season. City College was coached by Jerry Phipps and led by Lee Dedmon, who became an All-Atlantic Coast Conference center at North Carolina.

References

Baltimore City College
High school basketball in the United States